Cheese mites (for instance Tyrophagus casei or other species) are mites that are used to produce such cheeses as , Cantal and Mimolette. The action of the living mites on the surface of these cheeses contributes to the flavor and gives them a distinctive appearance. A 2010 scanning electron microscope study found that Milbenkäse cheese was produced using Tyrophagus casei mites, while Mimolette cheese used Acarus siro mites (also known as flour mites). Mimolette cheese, in particular, has live cheese mites in its rind which is thought to contribute to the cheese's distinct rind texture. 

Some cheese mite species, such as Tyrophagus putrescentiae and Acarus siro, are mycophagous and the fungus species they digest are determined by the digestive enzymatic properties accordingly of each species.

Gallery

See also
 Cheese fly, Piophila casei
The Cheese Mites, a 1903 documentary film

References

Microscopic animals
Acari and humans
Mites as food
Cheese
Arthropod common names